Jonny Halberg (born 12 October 1962 in Jørstadmoen, Lillehammer) is a Norwegian author and dramatist, now living in Moss, Jeløya. He studied at Forfatterstudiet i Bø. Halberg was the editor of the magazine Vagant in 1998. He has been translated to many languages.

Bibliography

Novels 
Trass (1996) 
Flommen (2000)  
En uskyldig tid (2002)
Gå til fjellet (2004) 
Tvillingen (2006)
All verdens ulykker (2007)

Short stories 
Overgang til tertiær  (1989) 
Gå under (1992)

Dramas 
Budbringeren – film script (1998) (with Pål Sletaune)
Amatørene – film script (2001) (with Pål Sletaune)

Prizes
Sult-prisen 1998
P2-lytternes romanpris 2000, for Flommen
Kritikerprisen 2000, for Flommen
Språklig samlings litteraturpris 2001

External links 
 NRK: sound files with Jonny Halberg
 Jonny Halberg at NRK Authors
 Jonny Halberg at Dagbladet Authors
 Jonny Halberg at Aftenposten Alex

1962 births
Living people
Norwegian male novelists
Norwegian Critics Prize for Literature winners
20th-century Norwegian novelists
21st-century Norwegian novelists
Norwegian male short story writers
Norwegian dramatists and playwrights
20th-century Norwegian male writers
21st-century Norwegian male writers